Adams Township is one of the twenty-five townships of Muskingum County, Ohio, United States.  The 2000 census found 516 people in the township.

Geography
Located on the northern edge of the county, it borders the following townships:
Franklin Township, Coshocton County - north
Linton Township, Coshocton County - northeast corner
Monroe Township - east
Highland Township - southeast corner
Salem Township - south
Madison Township - west
Cass Township - northwest, south of Virginia Township
Virginia Township, Coshocton County - northwest corner

No municipalities are located in Adams Township.

Name and history
Adams Township was named for John Quincy Adams, 6th President of the United States. It is one of ten Adams Townships statewide.

By the 1830s, Adams Township had two mills and a church.

Government
The township is governed by a three-member board of trustees, who are elected in November of odd-numbered years to a four-year term beginning on the following January 1. Two are elected in the year after the presidential election and one is elected in the year before it. There is also an elected township fiscal officer, who serves a four-year term beginning on April 1 of the year after the election, which is held in November of the year before the presidential election. Vacancies in the fiscal officership or on the board of trustees are filled by the remaining trustees.

References

External links
County website

Townships in Muskingum County, Ohio
Townships in Ohio